The Oklahoma Office of Juvenile Affairs (OJA) is an agency of the state of Oklahoma headquartered in Oklahoma City that is responsible for planning and coordinating statewide juvenile justice and delinquency prevention services. OJA is also responsible for operating juvenile correctional facilities in the State.

The Board of Juvenile Affairs is the governing body of OJA. The Board consists of seven members appointed by the Governor of Oklahoma, by and with the advice and consent of the Oklahoma Senate. The Board is responsible for appointing the Executive Director of the Office, who serves at the pleasure of the Board. The current Interim Executive Director is Rachel Holt.

The Office of Juvenile Affairs was created on July 1, 1995 during the term of Governor Frank Keating.

History
The Office of Juvenile Affairs was legislatively created during the 1994 session when the Oklahoma Legislature passed the Juvenile Reform Act. Prior to this time, services for Oklahoma's in-need-of-supervision and delinquent youth were provided by the Oklahoma Department of Human Services.

Leadership
The Office of Juvenile Affairs is under the supervision of the Secretary of Human Services. Under current Governor of Oklahoma Kevin Stitt, Justin Brown is serving as Secretary.

Board of Juvenile Affairs
The Board of Juvenile Affairs is the governing body of the Office of Juvenile Affairs. The Board consists of seven members appointed by the Governor of Oklahoma, by and with the advice and consent of the Oklahoma Senate. The term of office for each board member is six years. Appointments are limited to two terms. The Board is responsible for appointing the Executive Director of the Office, who serves at the pleasure of the Board.

The Board of Juvenile affairs sets broad policy for the OJA and is the rule making body for the OJA.  The Board is responsible for reviewing and approving the budget, assisting the agency in planning activities related to the priorities and policies of the agency, providing a public forum for receiving comments and disseminating information to the public, and establishing contracting procedures for the agency and guidelines for rates of payment for services provided by contract.

As of January 2014, the members of the Board are as follows:
Dr. Donnie L. Nero, Chairperson
Janice E. Smith, Co-Chairperson
Deanna Hartley-Kelso
Richard Rice
Scott Williams
Mark Hinson
Dr. Stephen Grissom

Organization
Board of Juvenile Affairs
Executive Director
General Counsel
Public Integrity
Government Relations
Chief of Staff
Chief Psychologist
Parol Administrator
Communications
Avocate General
Financial Services Division
Support Services Division
Institutional Services Division
Central Oklahoma Juvenile Center (COJC)
Southwest Oklahoma Juvenile Center (SWOJC)
Juvenile Services Division
District Offices 1 - 8
Community Based Youth Services Division

Staffing
The Rehabilitation Services Department, with an annual budget of well over $100 million, is one of the largest employers of the State. For fiscal year 2010, the Department was authorized 1,057 full-time employees.

Facilities
The Central Oklahoma Juvenile Center (COCJ), located in Tecumseh, holds both boys and girls. is located on a  plat of land and occupies  of it. The school opened in 1917 and was under the Oklahoma Office of Juvenile Affairs since 1995; previously it was in the Oklahoma Department of Human Services. It previously served as an orphanage and mental health center in addition to being a juvenile correctional facility. Known by its current name since 1992, it was previously known as Girls Town, the Oklahoma State Industrial School for Incorrigible Girls, the State Industrial School for White Girls, Russell Industrial School, and Central Oklahoma Juvenile Treatment Center.

The Southwest Oklahoma Juvenile Center is located in Manitou.

See also

Office of Juvenile Justice and Delinquency Prevention
Oklahoma Department of Public Safety
Attorney General of Oklahoma
Oklahoma Department of Corrections

References

External links
Oklahoma Office of Juvenile Affairs official website

Office of Juvenile Affiars
Juvenile detention centers in the United States
Oklahoma
1995 establishments in Oklahoma
Government agencies established in 1995